Saturnella is a genus of algae belonging to the family Oocystaceae.

Species:

Saturnella corticola 
Saturnella elegans 
Saturnella saturnus

References

Oocystaceae
Trebouxiophyceae genera
Trebouxiophyceae